The Anti-Kickback Enforcement Act of 1986 (originally codified at 41 U.S.C. § 51 et seq., recodified at ) modernized and closed the loopholes of previous statutes applying to government contractors. The law attempts to make the anti-kickback statute a more useful prosecutorial tool by expanding the definition of prohibited conduct and by making the statute applicable to a broader range of persons involved in government subcontracting.

References

99th United States Congress